GTX may refer to:

Companies
 GTx Incorporated, an American pharmaceutical company

Transportation
 Mazda Familia GTX, a turbocharged automobile
 Plymouth GTX, an automobile produced 1967–1971
 Sea-Doo GTX, a personal watercraft
 Great Train eXpress, an urban railway project in Seoul, South Korea

Science and technology
 GeForce GTX, a brand of graphics processing units
 Global Trade Exchange, a US Homeland Security intelligence project
 Gonyautoxin, several toxic molecules produced by algae
 GTX program, a 2002 NASA project for an Air-augmented_rocket

Other uses
 IMSA GTX, a sport car racing category